The following is a list of notable beverages associated with (and often limited to) specific regions of the United States. See also: List of regional dishes of the United States.



Non-alcoholic drinks

Alcoholic drinks

See also
 List of national drinks – a national drink is a distinct beverage that is strongly associated with a particular country, and can be part of their national identity and self-image
List of beverages of the Southern United States
 List of regional dishes of the United States
 Prohibition in the United States

References 

American drinks
United States
beverages